Estate Judith's Fancy, subdistrict of Saint Croix, U.S. Virgin Islands,  northwest of Christiansted is a former sugarcane plantation whose great house was built in 1733.  Its surviving  property was listed on the National Register of Historic Places in 1978.  The listing included six contributing sites.

Background
The site is significant for being the location of government headquarters during the French occupation of St. Croix during 1651–65, under the Knights of Malta's ownership, as well as for preserving remnants of typical buildings of a sugar plantation.  The property includes stonework ruins from a sugar factory, from a windmill which drew water, from a chimney of a later steam mill, and a small house.  The factory building is T-shaped, with a two-story section being  in plan.  An  wing was the boiling room.  A one-story  cookhouse with a charcoal stove is also attached.

References

Sugar plantations in Saint Croix, U.S. Virgin Islands
Plantations in the Danish West Indies
Buildings and structures completed in 1733
National Register of Historic Places in the United States Virgin Islands
Buildings and structures completed in 1810
1733 establishments in North America
1730s establishments in the Caribbean
1730s establishments in Denmark
18th century in the Danish West Indies